Honeymoon is a 2013 Czech drama film directed by Jan Hřebejk. It was nominated for the Crystal Globe at the 48th Karlovy Vary International Film Festival, where Hřebejk won the Best Director Award. The film was also screened in the Contemporary World Cinema section at the 2013 Toronto International Film Festival.

The film forms a loose trilogy with Hřebejk's previous films Kawasaki's Rose and Innocence, themed around guilt and forgiveness.

Cast
 Anna Geislerová as Tereza
 Stanislav Majer as Radim
 Jiří Černý as Benda
 Bořivoj Čermák as Filip
 Daniela Choděrová as Filip's mother
 David Máj as Milan
 Kristýna Nováková as Renata
 Juraj Nvota as Priest
 Jiří Šesták as Karel
 Matěj Zikán as Dominik

References

External links
 Líbánky at csfd.cz
 Líbánky at kinobox.cz
 

2013 films
2013 drama films
2010s Czech-language films
Films directed by Jan Hřebejk
Czech drama films